The Tetherless World Constellation (TWC) is a multidisciplinary research institution at Rensselaer Polytechnic Institute (RPI). The institution focuses on the study of theories, methods and applications of the World Wide Web. Research is carried out in three inter-connected themes: Future Web, Semantic Foundations and Xinformatics.

At Rensselaer, a constellation is a multidisciplinary team composed of senior and junior faculty members, research scientists, and postdoc, graduate, and undergraduate students. The faculty of each constellation includes three or more outstanding stars in a particular research field. The three professors at TWC are James Hendler, Deborah McGuinness and Peter Fox.

The Tetherless World Constellation is one of the founding members of the Web Science Trust network of research laboratories.

Previous faculty working with the TWC include NLP researcher Heng Ji.

References

External links 
 Tetherless World Web Site
 Rensselaer Polytechnic Institute
 Winslow Building on RPI Map

Rensselaer Polytechnic Institute
Education in Capital District (New York)
Engineering universities and colleges in New York (state)
Technological universities in the United States